

The ANBO I was a single-seat aircraft developed in Lithuania, proposed as a trainer for the Army It was a low-wing, braced monoplane of conventional tailwheel configuration. The fuselage structure was of fabric-covered welded steel tube, The wing had a wooden, two-spar structure and was fabric covered but the fuselage, also fabric covered, had a welded steel tube structure.

The first flight took place in 1925. Ten years later the aircraft was sold to Lithuanian Aviation Museum in Kaunas where it is exhibited today.

Operators

Lithuanian Air Force

Specifications

References

Further reading
 

Low-wing aircraft
Single-engined tractor aircraft
1920s Lithuanian military trainer aircraft
1
Aircraft first flown in 1925
1920s Lithuanian sport aircraft